Spain competed at these games.

The 1994 Games were held in Lillehammer, Norway.   The Games used the same venues as the Winter Olympics.

References

Nations at the 1994 Winter Paralympics
1994
1994 in Spanish sport